Ahmed Mumin Seed is a Somali politician, who served as the Somaliland's  Minister of Agriculture from 14 December 2017 to 2 September 2021.

See also

 Peace, Unity, and Development Party
 Ministry of Agriculture (Somaliland)
 List of Somalis

References

Living people
People from Awdal
Peace, Unity, and Development Party politicians
Government ministers of Somaliland
Year of birth missing (living people)
Gadabuursi